Caux is a surname. Notable people with the surname include:

 Jean Caux, the most famous mule packer of the Canadian West
 Marcel Caux (1899–2004), Australian World War I veteran
 Philippe Caux (born 1973), French curler, 2002 Winter Olympics participant
 Robert Caux, Canadian musician